Hajjah is a governorate of Yemen. It borders the Red Sea to the west, and its capital is also named Hajjah.

Geography

Adjacent governorates

 Saada Governorate (north)
 'Amran Governorate (east)
 Al Mahwit Governorate (south)
 Al Hudaydah Governorate (south)

Districts
Hajjah Governorate is divided into the following 31 districts. These districts are further divided into sub-districts, and then further subdivided into villages:

 Abs District
 Aflah Al Yaman District
 Aflah Ash Shawm District
 Al Jamimah District
 Al Maghrabah District
 Al Mahabishah District
 Al Miftah District
 Ash Shaghadirah District
 Ash Shahil District
 Aslem District
 Bakil Al Mir District
 Bani Al Awam District
 Bani Qa'is District
 Hajjah District
 Hajjah City District
 Harad District
 Hayran District
 Khayran Al Muharraq District
 Ku'aydinah District
 Kuhlan Affar District
 Kuhlan Ash Sharaf District
 Kushar District
 Mabyan District
 Midi District
 Mustaba District
 Najrah District
 Qafl Shamer District
 Qarah District
 Sharas District
 Wadhrah District
 Washhah District

References 

 
Governorates of Yemen